Musa voonii is a species of wild banana (genus Musa), native to Sarawak on the island of Borneo. It is placed in section Callimusa (now including the former section Australimusa), members of which have a diploid chromosome number of 2n = 20.

References

voonii
Endemic flora of Borneo
Flora of Sarawak
Plants described in 2004